were a Japanese idol duo consisting of Hideaki Takizawa and Tsubasa Imai from the Japanese talent agency Johnny & Associates. Takizawa, nicknamed "Tackey" (sometimes spelled as its literal romanization), is best known for his drama works, and Tsubasa for his dancing ability. They have also been musically successful with hit singles such as "Venus" and "Yume Monogatari". Their works are produced by Avex Trax.

Career

Pre-debut
Before their debut, Tackey and Tsubasa were the top "Juniors" in the Johnny & Associates, a company which specializes in male teen idols led by Johnny Kitagawa. They started out as backdancers for better known teen idols in their label such as KinKi Kids (who also had not yet debuted at the time) in 1995, when both were 13 years old. They have hosted the Japanese variety shows, Gakibara Teikoku 2000 and Music Enta. Besides hosting, the two have starred together in dramas such as Kaiki Club Ghost Stories and Genroku Ryoran. Initially, both of them did not get along well but during the filming of the NHK series Genroku Ryoran, which aired in 1999, they became best friends.

Before their official debut, the two performed together many times. In 1999, Tackey asked Tsubasa to join him in their first duet during the "Johnny's Juniors First Concert" in Tokyo, Japan. In April 2000, at the "Johnny's Juniors Spring 2002 Concert", the two performed their second duet together on stage. For this duet, the two designed their outfits, choreography and even their unit symbol (a tarantula). It was after this time that they hosted the two variety shows, Gakibara Teikoku 2000 and Music Enta, from 2000 to the beginning of 2001.

In February 2001, it was announced that the two would be headlining their first tour, called "Takki and Tsubasa 21st-century Showdown with all Johnny's Juniors". Tsubasa designed the costumes and Tackey designed the setting for this very successful tour, and for the first time in JE history, two Johnnys were distinguished in the title of a Junior tour. This led to many people believing that the two would debut as a duo like the KinKi Kids. Instead, at the end of this tour, Johnny Kitagawa announced the two would debut as solo artists in 2002. They were planned to officially debut when they reached 20-years-old due to their popularity.

For the 2002 "Johnny's Junior concert" the two were again announced to be the headliners of the tour, and it was during this tour that Tackey mentioned he wanted to debut as a duo with Tsubasa. Tackey asked his fans to organize a letter campaign to Johnny & Associates to let them debut as a duo. The fans then launched a campaign asking people who wanted them to debut together to send postcards and letters to Johnny & Associates, imploring Kitagawa to debut the two boys as a duo instead of as solo artists. The campaign has lasted for about a year, but then on August 1, 2002, Johnny announced that they would debut solo. Their debut solo songs would be entitled "Get Down" (Tsubasa's) and "Kiseki" (Tackey's). Yet, as a surprise instead, where the official announcement of their debut was to take place, the two announced they would be debuting as a duet after all. The two solo songs of theirs along with the duet song "True Heart" were the first releases from their debut mini-album, Hatachi (meaning 20-years-old in Japanese), which was released on September 11, 2002.

Post-debut
To date, Tackey & Tsubasa have released 10 singles, 3 albums and 3 DVDs: a significantly smaller number compared to their counterparts in the company. They have been quite successful; their most recent CD releases have reach the top position on the Japanese music charts. The two also share a very close friendship, being best friends; this aspect of their relationship is obvious through their interactions and interviews and is a very important part of the dynamic between them. Each has incredible strengths and skills, and as a result they complement each other very well. 

Their songs "Crazy Rainbow" and "Mirai Koukai" were one of the opening and ending theme songs respectively for popular Japanese anime One Piece. They were also featured in the opening animation of One Piece episode 303, added into the opening segment to their song that was used since episode 284. Also, their song "One Day, One Dream" was on the soundtrack of the Japanese anime Inuyasha.

Hiatus and break-up
On 3 September 2017, shortly before their 15th anniversary, the duo announced a hiatus. The hiatus began on 17 September, after they performed on Music Station Ultra Fes 2017. Tackey & Tsubasa disbanded on 10 September 2018.

Discography
In several cases, the English and romaji titles are given first, followed by the Japanese titles underneath.

Singles

Albums

Compilation albums

DVD
 "" (February 2, 2005)
 "Tsubasa Imai 1st tour 23 to 24" (August 16, 2006)
 "Hideaki Takizawa 2005 concert ~~" (August 30, 2006)
 "" (March 7, 2007)
 "Tackey and Tsubasa Premium Live DVD -5th Anniversary Special Package-" (March 3, 2008)
 "Tsubasa Imai Dance and Rock Tour'09" (August 2009)

References

External links 
Tackey & Tsubasa Official Website
Tackey & Tsubasa Oricon Page

Japanese-language singers
Avex Group artists
Japanese idol groups
Japanese pop music groups
Japanese boy bands
Johnny & Associates
Japanese musical duos
Musical groups from Tokyo